D. maritima may refer to:
 Dalbergia maritima, a legume species found only in Madagascar
 Drimia maritima, Sea Squill, a bulbous plant also known as Urginea maritima

See also
 Maritima (disambiguation)